Transporter 2 (French: Le Transporteur 2) is a 2005 French English-language action-thriller film directed by Louis Leterrier from a screenplay by Luc Besson and Robert Mark Kamen. It is the sequel to The Transporter (2002) and the second installment in the Transporter franchise. It stars Jason Statham as Frank Martin, with Alessandro Gassman, Amber Valletta, Kate Nauta, François Berléand, Matthew Modine, and Jason Flemyng. In the film, Frank is tasked with protecting the young son of politician Jefferson Billings (Modine) from an international drugs cartel. 

Transporter 2 was theatrically released in France on 3 August 2005, by EuropaCorp, and was released in the United States on 2 September by 20th Century Fox. It received mixed reviews from critics, with praise for Statham's performance but criticism for its screenplay. It grossed $89.1 million worldwide, and was followed by the sequel Transporter 3 (2008).

Plot
Frank Martin has relocated from southern France to Miami, Florida. As a favor to a friend, he becomes a temporary chauffeur for the wealthy Billings family. Frank bonds with their son, Jack, whom he drives to and from elementary school in his new Audi A8 W12. The marriage of Jefferson and Audrey Billings is under great strain due to the demands of his high-profile government job. This leads Audrey to seek solace in Frank, one time getting somewhat drunk and attempting to seduce him, but he tactfully sends her home.

Frank prepares for the arrival of Inspector Tarconi, his detective friend from France, who has come to spend his holiday in Florida with Frank. When Frank takes Jack for a medical checkup, he realizes barely in time that impostors have killed, and masqueraded as, the doctor and receptionist. A lengthy fight erupts between thugs, led by Lola, and the unarmed Frank; Frank manages to escape with Jack. Just as they arrive at Jack's house, he receives a phone call, informing him that he and Jack are in the sights of a sniper capable of penetrating the car's bulletproof glass. Forced at gunpoint to let Lola into the car, Frank speeds away with Jack, evading many pursuing police cars.

They arrive at a warehouse, where Frank meets Gianni Chellini, the ringleader of the operation. Frank is ordered to leave without Jack. He discovers an explosive attached to the car and succeeds in removing it a split-second prior to detonation. Jack is returned to his family after the payment of a ransom, but unknown to them and Frank, Jack has been injected with a deadly virus that will eventually kill anyone whom the child breathes on.

Suspected by everyone except Audrey of being one of the kidnappers, Frank tracks down the remaining fake doctor, Dimitri, with Tarconi's assistance. Frank infects Dimitri with the same virus, then lets him escape. Dimitri panics and hurries to a lab to get the cure, with Frank following behind. In his panic, Dimitri kills Tipov, another of Gianni's men, in his attempt to force the scientist in charge of the lab to give him the cure. Frank arrives and kills first another henchman, then Dimitri (after revealing that Dimitri was not infected after all); but when Frank refuses to bargain with him, the scientist hurls the only two vials containing the antidote out of the window into traffic. Frank manages to retrieve only one vial intact.

Frank sneaks back into the Billings home and tells an already ailing Audrey what is happening. He uses the antidote on Jack. Meanwhile, a coughing Jefferson, the director of National Drug Control Policy, addresses the heads of many anti-drug organizations from around the world at a conference; infecting all of them in the process.

Frank drives to Gianni's home, and finds that Gianni has decided to inject himself with the remaining supply of antidote as a precaution. After dispatching Gianni's many henchmen, Frank has the archvillain at gunpoint. Gianni explains that a Colombian drug cartel is paying him to get rid of its enemies; and that Frank cannot risk killing him, for his death would render the antidote unusable. An armed Lola shows up, leading to a standoff. Gianni leaves Lola to deal with Frank; which results in Frank killing her by impaling her on a wine rack with sharp metal points.

Frank tracks Gianni, who is making an escape in his helicopter to a waiting jet. Using a Lamborghini Murcielago Roadster from Gianni's garage, Frank speeds to the airport and boards Gianni's jet by driving onto the runway and climbing onto the jet's nose gear. After killing the co-pilot Frank gets into the interior of the plane and confronts Gianni, who pulls a gun on him. When they wrestle for it, a wild shot kills the pilot and the plane crash-lands in the ocean. Frank incapacitates Gianni, rendering him immobile while preserving the antidote in his system, then pushes his captive and himself out of the sinking plane. Boats converge to pick them up.

The Billings are given the antidote. When Frank visits them in the hospital, before entering their room, he sees them with Jack, who is joking with them. He silently walks back to his car, where Tarconi is waiting. He drops his friend at the airport. Alone, Frank receives a call from a man who needs a transporter, to which he replies: "I'm listening."

Cast

Reception
Transporter 2 opened in the United States on 2 September 2005. During its opening weekend, the film grossed $16 million in the U.S. In total, it earned $43 million in the U.S. and $85 million worldwide.

The film received mixed reviews. On Rotten Tomatoes, the film has a score of 52% based on reviews from 122 critics and reports a rating average of 5.41/10, with the reported consensus: "A stylish and more focused sequel to The Transporter, the movie is over-the-top fun for fans of the first movie." At Metacritic, which assigns a weighted average score out of 100 to reviews from mainstream critics, the film received an average score of 56 based on 29 reviews, indicating "mixed or average reviews". Audiences polled by CinemaScore gave the film an average grade of "B+" on an A+ to F scale.

Roger Ebert of the Chicago Sun-Times awarded the film 3 stars out of 4 and called it better than the original. In a special to The Los Angeles Times on the same day as the film's US release, director Louis Leterrier stated that Frank Martin was "the first gay action movie hero", suggesting that the character comes out when he refuses a woman's advances by saying, "It's because of who I am." This is contradicted by the plot of Transporter 3 where Frank Martin has sex with the female character he is transporting, and they end up together in what seems a permanent relationship. Three days after the US theatrical release of Transporter 3, in which Frank Martin develops a heterosexual relationship, the writer of Leterrier's 2005 interview with the Times e-mailed Leterrier about his opinion of the third film, which he did not direct. Leterrier seemed to backtrack, stating that after re-watching his first two films, "they aren't that gay".

Music

The soundtrack album for Transporter 2 was released in the United States on 6 September 2005 by TVT Records. It features sixteen tracks recorded by various artists, including the film score composed Alexandre Azaria. James Christopher Monger from Allmusic rated the album three stars out of five, citing Grand National's "Talk Amongst Yourselves", Anggun's "Saviour" and Mylo's "Paris Four Hundred" as the highlights of the soundtrack.

Soundtrack

Home media
In 2006, Louis Leterrier re-released an uncensored version of Transporter 2 on DVD. The uncensored release is roughly 25 seconds longer than the theatrical cut, and contains improved CGI, particularly during the car chase from the hospital as well as the private jet scene.  This release also contains more violent footage and blood during the fight scenes, and contains more nudity in certain scenes with Lola. It is available in Japan (R2 NTSC), France and the UK (both R2 PAL), as well as Thailand (R3 NTSC). It is also available on Blu-ray Disc in France and Japan (both releases are region-free). The Blu-ray was temporarily banned in North America for legal reasons, but has since been re-released. The uncensored fight footage as well as a longer car chase scene was only featured as deleted scenes on the US DVD release. Also the deleted footage included the killing of the doctor.

Sequel

A 2008 sequel, entitled Transporter 3, was released in the U.S. on 26 November 2008. The film follows Frank Martin as he returns to France.  It is the only film in the Transporter trilogy to be distributed by Lionsgate in the US.

References

External links
 
 
 
 

2005 films
2005 action thriller films
French action thriller films
2000s chase films
EuropaCorp films
20th Century Fox films
Fictional portrayals of the Miami-Dade Police Department
Films about automobiles
Films about infectious diseases
Films directed by Louis Leterrier
Films produced by Luc Besson
Films set in Miami
Films shot in Miami
Films with screenplays by Luc Besson
Films with screenplays by Robert Mark Kamen
French sequel films
Transporter (franchise)
English-language French films
2000s English-language films
2000s French films